Electronic Fun with Computers & Games was a video game magazine published in the United States from November 1982 to May 1984. For the last two issues it was renamed ComputerFun.

Content 
The magazine was split up into the following sections:
 Special Features
 Regular Features
 Equipment Reviews
 Game Reviews
 Departments

Staff 
For several months, West Virginia Broadcasting Hall of Fame member Gary "Music" Miller was a game reviewer for EFWCAG.

Legacy 
The cover art for the November 1983 issue was used as the album art for the 1984 album Night Lines by Dave Grusin.

External links 
 archive.org - PDF magazine repository
 digitpress.com - PDF magazine repository

Monthly magazines published in the United States
Video game magazines published in the United States
Defunct magazines published in the United States
Magazines established in 1982
Magazines disestablished in 1984
Magazines published in New York City
1982 establishments in New York (state)
1984 disestablishments in New York (state)